Yamada Dam  is a gravity dam located in Hyogo Prefecture in Japan. The dam is used for irrigation and water supply. The catchment area of the dam is 13.5 km2. The dam impounds about 5  ha of land when full and can store 174 thousand cubic meters of water. The construction of the dam was started on 1954 and completed in 1968.

See also
List of dams in Japan

References

Dams in Hyogo Prefecture